Duncan Weller (born, October 1975) is a Canadian writer and visual artist known for his children's picture books. He writes poetry, short stories, and novels for young people and adults. His visual art is displayed often in solo and group shows. Duncan won two of Canada's top awards, a Governor General's Award and the Ruth and Sylvia Schwartz Award, for his picture book The Boy from the Sun.

Early life and education
Duncan was born in Sherbrooke, Quebec in 1975 to English immigrants. His family moved to Thunder Bay where his father took an associate professor's job at Lakehead University. At the same university Duncan studied English Literature (HBA) and Visual Art (BA).

Career
Duncan moved around the country, living in Toronto, Victoria, North Vancouver and Montreal. He worked primarily as a picture framer and illustrator. In Vancouver he worked as a freelance sculptor, painter and director for Delta Play and Klondike Kidstuff, companies that produced play areas and large themed projects for museums and large commercial enterprises. Returning to Thunder Bay he worked in the marketing department of Magnus Theatre. In 2008 he won the 2007 Governor General's Award in the children's literature for his book The Boy from the Sun, as well the Ruth and Sylvia Schwartz Children's Book Award. He secured several grants from the Ontario Arts Council to continue his book and visual arts projects. He wrote an arts column for The Chronicle-Journalcalled, Art on the Edge. He received a Chalmers Arts Fellowship allowing him to do research in Ghana for a picture book. Due to breaches of contract by his Canadian publisher, Simply Read Books, Duncan obtained the rights to his previously published picture books. In 2013 he self-published three hardcover children's picture books, The Love Ant, Big Electric Cat, The Ugg and the Drip with a printing of 3,000 copies of each using Kromar printers in Winnipeg. In 2015 he printed 5,000 copies of a second expanded edition of The Boy from the Sun. Many future books are pending. Duncan continues to lend a hand on film productions as an actor and visual artist. In 2017 he opened a small gallery, Rogue Planet Gallery. In 2019 the gallery closed due to the pandemic. Currently Duncan is working on several book and visual art projects. One project is creating new visual art work for his solo show, The Noble Death of a Poet, to be held at the Thunder Bay Art Gallery in 2024.

Personal life
Duncan Weller's father, Geoffrey Weller, held several positions at Lakehead University, as a professor of political studies, Dean of Arts and Vice President. Geoffrey Weller's administration work, including comparative studies of the political, economic, and health care systems of the Northern Hemisphere helped secure his position in 1991 as the founding president of the University of Northern British Columbia. Geoffrey Weller's decision to include a wing within the university, and a mandatory course in indigenous studies for first year students devoted to local indigenous culture, attracted indigenous students and acclimatized Canadian and foreign students to the indigenous community. This progressive approach became a model that inspired dozens of universities across North America. At the time, UNBC was the first university built in Canada in twenty-five years. Geoffrey Weller served two terms as president before succumbing to lung cancer in 2000. Duncan Weller's mother, Jean, is a quilter who shows her work regularly, and has exhibited in the United States, Norway, and across Canada. Duncan Weller has two brothers: Eric, who teaches at Confederation College in Thunder Bay and makes films, and Alexander, who operates a retail outlet for martial/fantasy themed arts equipment in Victoria, British Columbia.

References

External links

Duncan Weller Pronunciation Guide on Teachingbooks.net

Living people
Canadian illustrators
1975 births
21st-century Canadian poets
Canadian male poets
Canadian male short story writers
21st-century Canadian short story writers
Writers from Sherbrooke
21st-century Canadian male writers